Juan Antonio Ipiña Iza (born 23 August 1912 in Ortuella, Biscay; died 7 September 1974) was a Spanish footballer and later a manager.

He coached Real Madrid CF from April 1952 to May 1953, having played with the club for ten years in the 1940s, and also coached Real Valladolid, Sevilla FC and Athletic Bilbao.

Honours

Player
Real Madrid
Copa del Generalísimo: 1946, 1947
Copa Eva Duarte: 1946

References

External links
Profile
 

1912 births
1974 deaths
Spanish footballers
Association football midfielders
Footballers from the Basque Country (autonomous community)
Sportspeople from Biscay
Real Madrid CF players
Real Sociedad footballers
Atlético Madrid footballers
La Liga players
La Liga managers
Spain international footballers
Spanish football managers
Real Valladolid managers
Real Madrid CF managers
Sevilla FC managers
Athletic Bilbao managers
People from Greater Bilbao
SD Erandio Club players